Ross Barta Zucco (April 20, 1934 – September 28, 1960) was an American speed skater. He competed in the 10,000 m event at the 1960 Winter Olympics and finished in 10th place. A few months later he was killed in a car accident by a 16-year-old drunk driver.

References

1934 births
1960 deaths
American male speed skaters
Olympic speed skaters of the United States
Speed skaters at the 1960 Winter Olympics
Road incident deaths in California